When logging began in British Columbia, Canada, in the late 19th century, the overriding concern was to harvest timber in the most economical fashion. Reforestation, aesthetics and protection of fish and wildlife habitat were not issues of great concern.

In a presentation to the Natural Resources Committee of the Canadian House of Commons in April 1994, Patrick Moore, an early member of Greenpeace, said destructive forest practices – not the concept of clearcutting – led to a high level of public concern over clearcutting and other forest management issues.

The use of clearcutting with reserves and variable retention has increased in British Columbia since the late 1990s, and the average size of clearcuts has decreased, improving the balance of environmental and economic objectives.

Clearcutting trends 

Until the mid-1990s, most harvesting on public lands in British Columbia involved clearcutting, From 1970 to 1998, clearcutting systems were applied on 87% of the area harvested on public land, and various partial cutting systems on 13%.

Advances in knowledge and a shift in the balance of objectives towards conservation of biological diversity led to the use of clearcutting with reserves and variable retention systems. Since 1999, 44% of the area on public lands has been harvested by clearcutting, with the remaining 56% harvested with partial cutting systems.

In 2009-2010, harvesting on public lands was by clearcutting with reserves (81%), clearcutting (15%), Retention cutting (3%), Other cutting methods (1%).

In 2015-2016, harvesting on public lands was by clearcutting with reserves (85%), clearcutting (11%), Retention cutting (3%), Other cutting methods (1%).

Social concerns about large clearcuts led to a decrease in average size from 45 hectares on public lands in 1989 to 30 hectares in 2006.

Clearcutting, though the most efficient and least expensive way of harvesting wood, may create difficulties that impede the establishment of regeneration. Obtaining natural regeneration of white spruce in Alaska and boreal Canada after clearcutting has proved to be difficult. In addition, white spruce that are outplanted in the open in boreal climates without a modicum of protective "nursing" can stagnate for decades.

What is clearcutting?

A silviculture system is a planned program of activities that encompasses how trees are harvested, regenerated, and managed over time. Foresters choose a silvicultural system according to the ecological traits of the tree species, and by balancing the objectives of the landowner.

Clearcutting removes trees from an area of one hectare or more, and greater than two tree heights in width, in a single harvesting operation. A new even-aged stand is obtained by planting, natural or advanced regeneration, or direct seeding. The opening size and dimensions created are generally large enough to limit significant microclimatic influence from the surrounding stand. It is most appropriate in forest ecosystems where tree species require an abundance of sunlight or grow in large, even-age stands.

Clearcutting with reserves is a variation of the clearcutting silvicultural system in which trees are retained, either uniformly or in small groups, for purposes other than regeneration. The overstory trees retained, called reserve trees, may be small or large trees, or combinations of small and large trees. They may be retained for future growth, certain species components, current or future den trees, future sources of snags or coarse woody debris, or some level of visual quality.

Clearcutting versus deforestation

Deforestation is the direct human-induced conversion of forested land to non-forested land. Harvesting when followed by regeneration is not deforestation although forestry operations such as permanent roads are deforestation.

Improved practices have increased the success rates for natural regeneration and planting, and have reduced failures by 90% since 1989. The quantity and quality of select seed used are increasing over time. Currently, virtually all logged areas on public lands in British Columbia are reforested within required time frames.

The mountain pine beetle epidemic is creating substantial reforestation challenges, compounded by the loss of past silvicultural investments, and areas that are inadequately stocked. The British Columbia government created the Forests for Tomorrow program in 2005 to reforest and restore areas damaged by the mountain pine beetle or wildfire that would otherwise remain unharvested.

From 1970 to 2007, British Columbia′s forests decreased in total area by about 12,000 hectares per year due to deforestation (conversion to other land uses). The rate of deforestation has been declining since the 1970s when there was considerable hydroelectric and agricultural development. Since 2000, the annual rate has been approximately 6,200 hectares per year.

In 2010, British Columbia introduced the Zero Net Deforestation Act so an equal area of trees is planted for carbon storage to offset any forest land that is permanently cleared for another use.
Since 1850, ecosystem conversion to agriculture, reservoirs, urban areas, and other land uses has occurred on a total of 2% of the province. Only the three smallest, warmest biogeoclimatic zones have had more than 10% of their former forests converted.

The area harvested each year translates to 0.4% of the forest area in British Columbia, and 0.8% of the forest area that is suitable for harvesting.

See also
 Deforestation in British Columbia
 List of forest regions and districts of British Columbia
 Wildstands (conservation organization)

References

Additional Articles
'Alternatives to Conventional Clearcutting' Forest Practices Branch, Victoria, BC, accessed 1 February 2010
'Clear-Cut Land in British Columbia, Canada' aerial survey image dated 1989, Lunar and Planetary Institute, accessed 1 February 2010
'Google Maps and Accountability' (7 April 2005), images of clearcutting, accessed 1 February 2010
'MacMillan Bloedel to halt clearcutting on BC land', Seattle Post-Intelligencer (June 11, 1998), accessed 1 February 2010
Coast Watch Society (Washington State) page on Clearcut Logging, accessed 1 February 2010

External Resources
The State of British Columbia's Forests Third Edition
Society of American Foresters Clearcutting as a Silvicultural Practice
West Virginia University The Clearcutting Controversy - Myths and Facts
Forest Encyclopedia Network Advantages and disadvantages of clearcutting
British Columbia Ministry of Forests Introduction to Silvicultural Systems

Forestry in Canada